Abertzale left is a term used to refer to the parties or organizations of the Basque nationalist/separatist left, stretching from democratic socialism to communism.

This leftist character is highlighted in contrast to the traditional jeltzale nationalism represented by the Basque Nationalist Party (EAJ-PNV), a conservative and Christian-democratic party, which has long been the largest in the Basque Country. The first examples of abertzale parties are the Basque Nationalist Republican Party (EAAE-PRNV), active from 1909 to 1913, and the Basque Nationalist Action (EAE-ANV), active from 1930 to 2008. They represented the non-confessional Basque nationalist references when ETA was formed in 1959 by younger generations. Ezker abertzalea (or, in Spanish, izquierda abertzale) is notably used when referring to the leftist-nationalist environment of Batasuna, an outlawed political party.

More recently, in 1986, a left-wing splinter group of EAJ-PNV led by Carlos Garaikoetxea formed a new social-democratic party, Basque Solidarity (EA). After ETA's permanent ceasefire (2010), EA engaged in a convergence process with the scattered historic Basque nationalist left closer to ETA. In 2011–2012, they joined forces in forming a succession of coalitions: Bildu, Amaiur and, finally, EH Bildu. A group of former members of Batasuna were identified by the media as independents of izquierda abertzale.

References

Basque politics
National liberation movements
Rebellions in Spain
Articles containing video clips
Socialism
Left-wing nationalism